Jim Grabb and Richey Reneberg were the defending champions, but Reneberg did not participate this year.  Grabb partnered Jared Palmer, finishing runner-up.

Jacco Eltingh and Paul Haarhuis won the title, defeating Grabb and Palmer 6–3, 6–4 in the final.

Seeds

  Byron Black /  Jonathan Stark (quarterfinals)
  Jacco Eltingh /  Paul Haarhuis (champions)
  Luke Jensen /  Murphy Jensen (first round)
  Steve DeVries /  David Macpherson (quarterfinals)

Draw

Draw

References
Draw

U.S. Pro Indoor
1994 ATP Tour